The Tristan hotspot is a volcanic hotspot which is responsible for the volcanic activity which forms the volcanoes in the southern Atlantic Ocean. It is thought to have formed the island of Tristan da Cunha and the Walvis Ridge on the African Plate.

Geology
It is also believed to be closely connected with the Paraná and Etendeka flood basalt provinces, which formed over the hotspot during the opening of the South Atlantic Ocean.

The Tristan and Gough hotspots are widely spaced end-members of the volcanic system that generated the Walvis Ridge on the African plate and the Rio Grande Rise on the South American plate beginning at  when the Paraná and Etendeka traps formed.  Whether or not Tristan and Gough represent two distinct volcanic centers is still debated.

 argued that the Walvis Ridge is not the product of a deep mantle plume or the Tristan hotspot, but that changes in the internal stress in the spreading African and South American plates trigger changes in the magmatic processes in the Mid-Atlantic Ridge.  The Walvis Ridge should then have developed as a result of these periodic stress releases along the Mid-Atlantic Ridge.

 found that the hotspot trails in the eastern South Atlantic (Tristan, Gough, Discovery, Shona, and possibly Bouvet) started forming synchronously .  Older seamounts east of these hotspot trails formed at the edge of the African swell where the oceanic crust was spreading apart and are not the product of hotspot volcanism.  The Tristan-Gough trail switched from forming a series of aseismic ridges to a broader line of guyots and smaller volcanic ridges at about the same time.

The hotspots of the eastern South Atlantic formed along the plume generation zones (PGZs) of the African large low seismic velocity province (LLSVP).  LLSVPs are dense and stable structures, and most of the plumes, kimberlites, and large igneous provinces (LIPs) on Earth can be rotated back to the PGZs.  All major African LIPs (Karoo, Paraná-Etendeka, and Agulhas) formed at the PGZs of the African LLSVP but  the Tristan-Gough hotspot was the only hotspot located at a spreading boundary and therefore the only African hotspot that started to form a volcanic trail.

Palaeoclimatic and evolutionary role
Based on molecular estimates,  found that the Homo-Pan divergence occurred  (in contrast to earlier estimates that suggested around 5 Ma). Arnason et al. hypothesised that the Rio Grande-Walvis Ridge system was exposed above sea level and formed a chain of islands across the South Atlantic during the Maastrichtian and Palaeocene  allowing the primates to disperse across the ocean. Other researchers dismiss the hypothesis of Arnason et al. instead favouring a less spectacular rafting event.

Other hints of transoceanic island hopping in the fossil record is Lavocatavis, a flightless terror bird found in Eocene layers in Algeria, the only one found outside South America.

References

Notes

Sources

 
 
 
 
 
 
 

Geography of Tristan da Cunha
Hotspots of the Atlantic Ocean
Geology of Saint Helena, Ascension and Tristan da Cunha
.